The greater palatine canal (or pterygopalatine canal) is a passage in the skull that transmits the descending palatine artery, vein, and greater and lesser palatine nerves between the pterygopalatine fossa and the oral cavity.

Structure
The greater palatine canal starts on the inferior aspect of the pterygopalatine fossa.  It goes through the maxilla and palatine bones to reach the palate, ending at the greater palatine foramen.  From this canal, accessory canals branch off; these are known as the lesser palatine canals.

The canal is formed by a vertical groove on the posterior part of the maxillary surface of the palatine bone; it is converted into a canal by articulation with the maxilla.

The canal transmits the descending palatine vessels, the greater palatine nerve, and the lesser palatine nerve.

See also
 Greater palatine foramen
 Pterygopalatine fossa

Additional images

References

External links

Foramina of the skull